Howard Davies may refer to:

 Howard Davies (rugby union) (1916–1987), Wales rugby union international
 Sir Howard Davies (economist) (born 1951), former Director of the London School of Economics and former British financial regulator
 Howard Davies (director) (1945–2016), English theatre director
 Howard R. Davies (1895–1973), English originator of the historic HRD motorcycle marque and motorcycle racer
 Howard Davies (hurdler) (1906–1993), South African hurdler
 Howard Davies (sprinter) (born 1944), British sprinter
 Howard Davies (actor) (1879–1947), English-born American actor in The Man Who Laughs (1928 film)

See also
 Howard Davis (disambiguation)
 John Howard Davies (1939–2011), English child actor who later became a television director and producer